Seven Wiser is the self-titled debut album by American rock band Seven Wiser. Although the album was not heavily promoted, the album sold over 10,000 copies in its short time available.

Track listing
 "Intro" – 0:34
 "Life" – 3:16
 "We're Sad" – 3:13
 "Take Me As I Am" – 3:56
 "Self Esteem" – 4:00
 "Regret" – 3:24
 "Good As You Think" – 3:32
 "Lies" – 3:00
 "Sick" – 3:06
 "Love To Hate" – 2:46
 "Losing Grip" – 3:42
 "One In Equal" – 3:29
 "Talk To Me" – 2:28

B-side
 "Never"

Use in media
 The track "Sick" has appeared on The Punisher Soundtrack, and in Wes Craven's Cursed.
 The song "Life" appears on the EA Sports video game NASCAR 2005: Chase for the Cup.
 The song "Take Me As I Am" appears on the EA Sports video game MVP Baseball 2004.

Personnel
 Jon Santos – Vocals
 Bill Lau – Guitar
 Rob Ellis – Bass
 Jerry Keating – Drums
 John Signorella – Drums

References

2004 debut albums
Seven Wiser albums
Wind-up Records albums